Henlawson is a census-designated place (CDP) in Logan County, West Virginia, United States. Henlawson has a post office with ZIP code 25624. As of the 2010 census, its population was 442. Henlawson is believed to have been named after a resident, Henry Lawson. Merrill Coal Mines  opened Merrill Mines here in 1921 and built homes to house the miners.

Geography
Henlawson is located in north-central Logan County, on the east bank of the Guyandotte River across from Mitchell Heights to the north and Justice Addition to the southwest.

The Guyandotte is a north-flowing tributary of the Ohio River.

References

Census-designated places in Logan County, West Virginia
Census-designated places in West Virginia
Coal towns in West Virginia
Populated places on the Guyandotte River